The Canton of Péronne is a canton situated in the department of the Somme and in the Hauts-de-France region of northern France.

Geography 
The canton is organised around the commune of Péronne, in the arrondissement of Péronne.

Composition
At the French canton reorganisation which came into effect in March 2015, the canton was expanded from 21 to 60 communes:

Aizecourt-le-Bas
Aizecourt-le-Haut
Allaines
Barleux
Bernes
Biaches
Bouchavesnes-Bergen
Bouvincourt-en-Vermandois
Brie
Buire-Courcelles
Bussu
Cartigny
Cléry-sur-Somme
Combles
Devise
Doingt
Driencourt
Épehy
Équancourt
Estrées-Mons
Éterpigny
Étricourt-Manancourt
Feuillères
Fins
Flaucourt
Flers
Ginchy
Gueudecourt
Guillemont
Guyencourt-Saulcourt
Hancourt
Hardecourt-aux-Bois
Hem-Monacu
Hervilly
Herbécourt
Hesbécourt
Heudicourt
Lesbœufs
Liéramont
Longavesnes
Longueval
Marquaix
Maurepas
Mesnil-Bruntel
Mesnil-en-Arrouaise
Moislains
Nurlu
Péronne
Pœuilly
Rancourt
Roisel
Ronssoy
Sailly-Saillisel
Sorel
Templeux-la-Fosse
Templeux-le-Guérard
Tincourt-Boucly
Villers-Carbonnel 
Villers-Faucon
Vraignes-en-Vermandois

Before 2015, the composition was as follows:

Aizecourt-le-Haut
Allaines
Barleux
Biaches
Bouchavesnes-Bergen
Bouvincourt-en-Vermandois
Brie
Buire-Courcelles
Bussu
Cartigny
Cléry-sur-Somme
Doingt
Estrées-Mons
Éterpigny
Feuillères
Flaucourt
Mesnil-Bruntel
Moislains
Nurlu
Péronne
Villers-Carbonnel

Population

See also
 Arrondissements of the Somme department
 Cantons of the Somme department
 Communes of the Somme department

References

Peronne